The Battle of the Nile was a significant naval action fought during 1–3 August 1798. The battle took place in Aboukir Bay, near the mouth of the River Nile on the Mediterranean coast of Egypt and pitted a British fleet of the Royal Navy against a fleet of the French Navy. The battle was the climax of a three-month campaign in the Mediterranean during which a huge French convoy under General Napoleon Bonaparte had sailed from Toulon to Alexandria via Malta. Despite close pursuit by a British fleet of thirteen ships of the line, one fourth rate and a sloop under Sir Horatio Nelson, the French were able to reach Alexandria unscathed and successfully land an army, which Bonaparte led inland. The fleet that had escorted the convoy, consisting of thirteen ships of the line, four frigates and a number of smaller vessels under Vice-amiral François-Paul Brueys D'Aigalliers, anchored in Aboukir Bay as Alexandria harbour was too narrow, forming a line of battle that was protected by shoals to the north and west.

Nelson reached the Egyptian coast on 1 August and discovered the French fleet at 14:00. Advancing during the afternoon, his ships entered the bay at 18:20 and attacked the French directly, despite the rapid approach of nightfall. Taking advantage of a large gap between the lead French ship Guerrier and the northern shoal, HMS Goliath rounded the French line at 18:40 and opened fire from the unprepared port side, followed by five more British ships. The rest of the British line attacked the starboard side of the French van, catching the ships in a fierce crossfire. For three hours the battle continued as the British overwhelmed the first five French ships but were driven away from the heavily defended centre. The arrival of reinforcements allowed a second assault on the centre at 21:00 and at 22:00 the French flagship Orient exploded. Despite the death of Vice-amiral Brueys, the French centre continued to fight until 03:00, when the badly damaged Tonnant managed to join the thus far unengaged French rear division. At 06:00 firing began again as the less damaged ships of the British fleet attacked the French rear, forcing Contre-amiral Pierre-Charles Villeneuve to pull away for the mouth of the bay. Four French ships were too badly damaged to join him and were beached by their crews, two subsequently surrendered. Villeneuve eventually escaped to open water with just two ships of the line and two frigates. On 3 August the last two remaining French ships stranded in the bay were defeated, one surrendering and the other deliberately set on fire by its crew.

The almost total destruction of the French fleet reversed the strategic situation in the Mediterranean, giving the Royal Navy control of the sea which it retained until the end of the Napoleonic Wars in 1815. Nelson and his captains were highly praised and generously rewarded, although Nelson privately complained that his peerage was not senior enough. Bonaparte's army was trapped in the Middle East and Royal Navy dominance played a significant part in its subsequent defeat at the Siege of Acre, Bonaparte himself abandoned the army late in 1799 to return to France and deal with the outbreak of the War of the Second Coalition. Of the captured ships, three were no longer serviceable and were burnt in the bay, and three others were judged fit only for harbour duties owing to the damage they had received in the battle. The remainder enjoyed long and successful service careers in the Royal Navy; two subsequently served at the Battle of Trafalgar in 1805.

Orders of battle
The ships in the orders of battle below are listed in the order in which they appeared in the respective battle lines. Listed in the casualties section are the totals of killed and wounded as best as can be established: due to the nature of the battle, French losses were hard to calculate precisely. Officers killed in action are marked with a † symbol. Note that as carronades were not traditionally taken into consideration when calculating a ship's rate, these ships may have been carrying more guns than indicated below.

British fleet

French fleet

Notes

References

Bibliography
 
 
 
 
 
 
 
 
 
 
 
 
 
 
 
 

the Nile
Mediterranean campaign of 1798
the Nile